The term South Park Historic District may refer to:

South Park Manor Historic District, Chicago, Illinois, listed on the National Register of Historic Places listings in Chicago
South Park Neighborhood, a historic district in Winchester, Kentucky, listed on the National Register of Historic Places listings in Clark County, Kentucky
South Park Historic District (Dayton, Ohio), listed on the National Register of Historic Places in Dayton, Ohio
South Park Historic District (Morgantown, West Virginia), listed on the National Register of Historic Places listings in Monongalia County, West Virginia
A section of the South Park, San Diego neighborhood designated as the South Park Historic District by the San Diego Historic Resources Board